Charles Stephens may refer to:

 Charlie Stephens (born 1981), Canadian ice hockey forward
 C. A. Stephens (1844–1931), American writer of short stories and articles
 C. W. Stephens (c.1846–1917), British architect, best known for Harrods
 Charles Stephens (daredevil) (1862–1920), first person to die attempting to go over Niagara Falls
 Charles Edward Stephens (1821–1892), English musician and composer

See also
Charles Stevens (disambiguation)